Zahid Ali (born 30 June 1976) is a Norwegian stand-up comedian. He is known for his participation in the TV2 show Rikets Røst, which is hosted by Otto Jespersen. After the publicity this show resulted in, he has become a popular comedian and actor.

In 2006 Ali, who is of Pakistani descent, gathered almost all of the most popular comedians in Norway to raise money for relief work in Pakistan after the earthquake disaster that year. All the money raised was donated to the Embassy of Pakistan and was used to build a new school in Kashmir.

In December 2006, Ali appeared in the series Jul i Tøyengata on Norwegian channel TVNorge, playing the lead role as shoemaker Ali. The series was an Advent calendar-type series, aired daily up until 24 December. It was a spoof of an original children's Christmas series in Norway, Jul i Skomakergata.

In 2010 Ali received the Brobyggerprisen, a Norwegian prize for building relations between immigrants and  Norwegian natives. His work is also about fighting prejudice. Zahid Ali has also toured with his stand-up show Zahid Ali-live and often appears in corporate videos.

He acted in the 2005 film Izzat and the television series Hellfjord.

See also
 Norwegians of Pakistani descent

References

External links
 

Norwegian male comedians
Norwegian people of Pakistani descent
Norwegian male film actors
Norwegian male television actors
21st-century Norwegian male actors
Norwegian stand-up comedians
1977 births
Living people